Bradley James Webb (born 9 June 2001) is an English professional footballer who plays as a left-back for Hemel Hempstead Town.

Career
Webb signed for Bristol City on scholarship terms at the end of the 2016–17 season, following a trial. During the 2019–20 season he spent loan spells at Taunton Town, Yate Town and Hungerford Town.

In September 2020 he moved on loan to Newport County for the 2020–21 season. Webb made his professional debut for Newport on 6 October 2020 in the starting line up for the 5-0 EFL Trophy defeat against Norwich City Under 21s. On 2 January 2021 his loan spell at Newport was ended. On 8 January he moved on loan to Gloucester City until the end of the 2020-21 season. On 9 February 2021, the loan was terminated and Webb returned to Bristol City.

On 4 December 2021, Webb signed for National League side Aldershot Town.

On 11 January 2022, Webb joined Southern League Premier Division South side Farnborough on loan. Webb was released in May 2022.

On 18 July 2022, Webb joined National League South club Hemel Hempstead Town.

Career statistics

References

2001 births
Living people
English footballers
Bristol City F.C. players
Taunton Town F.C. players
Yate Town F.C. players
Hungerford Town F.C. players
Newport County A.F.C. players
Gloucester City A.F.C. players
Aldershot Town F.C. players
Farnborough F.C. players
Hemel Hempstead Town F.C. players
Association football defenders
Southern Football League players
National League (English football) players